Trinity Cheltenham is an Evangelical, charismatic Anglican church in Cheltenham, Gloucestershire. It was originally known as "Trinity" when it was first opened but later "Holy Trinity" before reverting to its original name.  As well as being part of the Church of England, it is a major contributor to the New Wine network. The Church has around 1000 members, making it one of the largest churches in the UK. A recent article cited it as the 11th largest church in Britain.

Location
The main church building is located on Portland Street, Cheltenham. The church also owns Trinity House and Trinity Fusion, behind the church building on Trinity Lane, and its offices are located in Winchcombe House.

Senior Leadership and Staff 

 Reverend Andrew Blyth - Lead Pastor & Team Rector
 Reverend Tim Grew – Pastor & Team Vicar
 Hils Grew - Pastor
 Reverend Nick Stott - Pastor
 Reverend Simon Fellows - Pastor & Curate
 Liz Lang – Churchwarden
 Barry Lambert – Churchwarden

Trinity also employs a number of staff on a full-time or part-time basis, and all of its events and activities are facilitated by a large number of volunteers.

History 

Trinity Church came into being in 1824 as an overflow from the Parish Church in the town centre. The first minister was the Rev Francis Close, Rector of Cheltenham and later Dean of Carlisle Cathedral, after whom the Dean Close School was named. The Church was opened with an address from the Rev Charles Simeon.

In 1976, Trinity Church was on the point of closure. However, under the ministry of a retired missionary (Canon Lawrence Totty) change had slowly begun to happen.  The threat of closure was removed and under two subsequent vicars, Rev John Risdon and Rev Paul Harris,  the church continued to grow and start to reach out into the community.

Current Activity 

In 1994 Mark Bailey was appointed as a pastor, and since then the church has undergone a major renovations: pews have been replaced with chairs, carpet fitted, pipe organ removed, and the décor changed to enable greater flexibility in the building's use. In 2000, Trinity House, the three-storey building immediately behind the church, was purchased. The additional space has greatly increased the opportunities for ministry. As well as the Sunday services each week, the church members participate in a large array of mid-week activities, which include the Alpha Course, 'King's Table', Life Groups and Kids, Youth and Student activities. There are now more than 1,000 people who worship on a regular basis.

Continued growth presented logistical problems, and by the end of 2004 the church started holding multiple services each Sunday. In January 2005 the 'Trinity Growth Project' was launched and most of the staff and administrative team moved out of Trinity House to offices in Winchcombe House. In 2008 the church purchased the Fusion Building next to Trinity House on Winchcombe Street, and in 2009 began a refurbishment of the main church building to increase the capacity to nearly 650.

Mark Bailey resigned as team rector and accepted a two-year suspension from ministry by the Bishop of Gloucester in 2016.

References

External links
 [1] Trinity Cheltenham Website

Churches in Cheltenham
Cheltenham
Cheltenham, Holy Trinity
Cheltenham Trinity
Grade II* listed buildings in Gloucestershire